|-

|-

|}

This is a list of results for the Legislative Council at the 2019 New South Wales state election.

Candidates of six parties were elected in the end.

Quota was 202,325

The final result was performed by computer on 12 April 2019.

Results

Continuing members 

The following members of the Legislative Council were not up for re-election this year.

See also
 Results of the 2019 New South Wales state election (Legislative Assembly)
 Candidates of the 2019 New South Wales state election
 Members of the New South Wales Legislative Council, 2019–2023

Notes

References

2019 Legislative Council